The history of the Jews in Kazakhstan connects back to the history of Bukharan and Juhuro Mountain Jews. Kazakh Jews have a long history. There are approximately several thousand Jews in Kazakhstan right at present.

Most Kazakh Jews are Ashkenazi and speak Russian.

Jewish history in Kazakhstan

General Secretary Joseph Stalin evacuated thousands of Jews from other parts of the Soviet Union to the Kazakh SSR. During the Holocaust 8,218 Jews were evacuated to Kazakhstan between August 1941 and January 1942.

A Chabad-Lubavitch synagogue in Almaty is named after Rabbi Levi Yitzchak Schneerson, father of the Rebbe, who is buried at the city's cemetery, close to the synagogue. Levi Yitzchak Schneerson was exiled to Kazakhstan from Ukraine, Dnepropetrovsk, where he was a chief rabbi. Lubavitcher Jews from all over the world come to pray at his grave.

Yeshaya E. Cohen, the Chief Rabbi of Kazakhstan, and leader of the Alliance of Rabbis in Islamic States told Kazinform on January 16, 2004 that a new synagogue would be built in Astana. He thanked President Nazarbayev for "paying so much attention to distinguishing between those who truly believe and those who want to hijack their religion." President of the Euro-Asian Jewish Congress, presented Nazarbayev with a menorah on 7 September 2004.

Historical Demographics

Kazakhstan's Jewish population rapidly increased between 1926 and 1959, being almost eight times larger in 1959 than in 1926. Kazakhstan's Jewish population slowly declined between 1959 and 1989, followed by a much larger decline after the fall of Communism between 1989 and 2002 due to massive Jewish emigration, mostly to Israel.
 Jewish Kazakh fencer Yakov Rylsky (1928 – 1999) was a Soviet Olympic and world champion sabre fencer.

Jewish life today

About 2,000 Jewish Kazakhs are Bukharan and Juhuro Mountain Jews. There are synagogues and large Jewish communities in Almaty where there are 1,000 Jews in Astana and Pavlodar. Many of the Neo-Aramaic speaking Jews of Salmas now reside in Almaty. There are smaller communities in Karaganda, Shymkent, Semey, Kokshetau, Taraz, Oral, Aktobe, and Petropavl.

There are twenty Jewish Kazakh organizations, including the Mitzvah Association, Chabad, the American Jewish Joint Distribution Committee, Jewish Agency for Israel, and the All-Kazakhstan Jewish Congress (AKJC). The Jewish communities formed the AKJC in December 1999 in a ceremony attended by Kazakh government officials and United States Ambassador to Kazakhstan, Richard Jones.

There are fourteen Jewish day schools attended by more than 700 students. There is a Jewish kindergarten in Almaty. Between 2005 and 2006 attendance in religious services and education in Almaty among Jews greatly increased. The government of Kazakhstan registered eight foreign rabbis and "Jewish missionaries". It has also donated buildings and land for the building of new synagogues.

According to the National Coalition Supporting Soviet Jewry, "Anti-Semitism is not prevalent in Kazakhstan and rare incidents are reported in the press," contrary to incorrect perceptions in popular culture caused by the country's portrayal in the 2006 film Borat as a "hot-bed of anti-Semitism."

See also
History of the Jews in Central Asia
Israel–Kazakhstan relations
Bukharian Jews
Christianity in Kazakhstan
Hinduism in Kazakhstan
Islam in Kazakhstan
Roman Catholicism in Kazakhstan
Baptist Union of Kazakhstan

Notes

References

Further reading
  Report PDF

External links
 Chabad-Lubavitch in Kazakhstan.
 Embassy of Israel in Kazakhstan
 Mitzvah Club Association.

Asian Ashkenazi Jews